Nate "Gus" Gustafson (born 1995) is an American information technology professional and Republican politician from Winnebago County, Wisconsin.  He is a member of the Wisconsin State Assembly, representing Wisconsin's 55th Assembly district since January 2023.  He is also currently a member of the Winnebago County board of supervisors.

Biography
Nate Gustafson was born in Appleton, Wisconsin, and raised in the village of Fox Crossing, Wisconsin (formerly the town of Menasha).  He attended public schools in the Neenah Joint School District, and went on to attend University of Wisconsin–Oshkosh, Fox Cities Campus.  He ultimately received his associate's degree in cybersecurity from the Fox Valley Technical College in 2018.

He has worked for a number of companies in northern Winnebago County, and is now working as an Epic analyst at NOVO Health Technology Group.

Political career
Gustafson's first job in politics was serving as campaign manager for Rachael Cabral-Guevara during her first run for Wisconsin State Assembly in 2020.  After her successful election, he worked for Elijah Behnke in his 2021 special election.  Following that campaign, he created Winnebago County for Freedom, a volunteer organization in his community to boost conservative candidates.

In the Spring 2022 election, he was elected to the Winnebago County board of supervisors.

In March 2022, Cabral-Guevara announced she would run for Wisconsin State Senate that year, rather than seeking another term in the Assembly.  That same day, Gustafson launched his campaign to succeed Cabral-Guevara in the 55th Assembly district.  Gustafson faced no challengers in the Republican primary, and went on to defeat Democrat Stefanie A. Holt in the general election, receiving 54% of the vote.

He assumed office in January 2023.

Electoral history

Wisconsin Assembly (2022)

| colspan="6" style="text-align:center;background-color: #e9e9e9;"| General Election, November 8, 2022

Reference

External links
 Campaign website
 Official (county) website
 
 Nate Gustafson at Wisconsin Vote

1995 births
Living people
Republican Party members of the Wisconsin State Assembly
Politicians from Appleton, Wisconsin
People from Winnebago County, Wisconsin
County supervisors in Wisconsin
21st-century American politicians
Fox Valley Technical College alumni